Ko Kieft (born January 20, 1998) is an American football tight end for the Tampa Bay Buccaneers of the National Football League (NFL). He played college football at Minnesota.

Professional career
Kieft was drafted by the Tampa Bay Buccaneers in the sixth round, 218th overall, in the 2022 NFL Draft.

References

External links
 Tampa Bay Buccaneers bio
 Minnesota Golden Gophers bio

1998 births
Living people
American football tight ends
Minnesota Golden Gophers football players
Tampa Bay Buccaneers players